B59 or B-59 may refer to:

 B-59 military hardware:
 Boeing XB-59, American aircraft model
 Soviet submarine B-59, a submarine
 B59:
 European highways:
 Bundesstraße 59, in the German Bundesstraße system
 Eisenstädter Straße in the Austrian Landesstraße system
 Volvo B59 Swedish-market bus chassis  
 HLA-B59, serotype re Human Leucocyte Antigen
 B59, chess variation arising from 5...Nc6 in Sicilian Defence
 Barnard 59, AKA Pipe Nebula